Paralepetopsis floridensis is a species of sea snail, a true limpet, a marine gastropod mollusk in the family Neolepetopsidae, one of the families of true limpets.

Paralepetopsis floridensis is the type species in the genus Paralepetopsis.

Description

Distribution
West of the coast of Florida between continental slope and continental rise, at the base of continental slope

Habitat 
cool, hypersaline and sulphide seeps

References

External links

Neolepetopsidae
Gastropods described in 1990